Anne Méniane, also reported as Anne Meniane, is a French badminton player. She was born on 11 June 1959 in Paris. She won 20 French national badminton championship titles in singles and doubles before retiring in 1989–90. She was singles champion in 1978, 1979, 1980, 1982, 1984, 1985 and 1986; won in the women's doubles in the same years; and won in the mixed doubles in 1978, 1979, 1984, 1985, 1986 and 1988.

Since then she has married Thierry Attia in Paris and had two kids. They have now settled in Montreal, Canada.

References 

French female badminton players
1959 births
Living people